Dacrydium araucarioides is a species of conifer in the family Podocarpaceae. It is found only in New Caledonia.  It is a small tree that reaches a height between 3 and 6 metres.

The species is common and widespread, particularly in the south of Grand Terre and along the east coast northwards to Houailou.

References

araucarioides
Endemic flora of New Caledonia
Trees of New Caledonia
Least concern plants
Taxonomy articles created by Polbot
Taxa named by Adolphe-Théodore Brongniart
Taxa named by Jean Antoine Arthur Gris